Shota (or Shotë) is an Albanian dance very popular in Albania and Kosovo. It involves synchronised steps, and a strong rhythm. It  is commonly played at weddings, folk festivals and other events.

During the 20s century this dance was performed in Serbia based on the choreography of Olga Skovran, leader (from 1948-1965) of the National Ensemble of Folk Dances and Songs of Serbia "Kolo". The choreography was created in 1952 and was very popular. As a result, even a song was composed with the Shota melody. "Šote, mori šote" was set to music in 1976 in two versions. Both versions were very popular and were often played at celebrations.

One folklore musical ensemble in SFR Yugoslavia was named Šota.

History

In March 2013 the Assembly of Republic of Kosovo approved a law which makes ‘Shota’ a part of the cultural activities of the National Ensemble of Songs and Dances.

Since the time of its inception the community keeps organising events that replicates the dance form Shota and are socially very active in areas of cleanliness, awareness about the dance form and the dress codes related to it.

References

Kosovan culture
Albanian folk dances